The 1893 Rhode Island gubernatorial election was held on April 5, 1893. Incumbent Republican Daniel Russell Brown defeated Democratic nominee David S. Baker with 46.34% of the vote.

General election

Candidates
Major party candidates
Daniel Russell Brown, Republican
David S. Baker, Democratic

Other candidates
Henry B. Metcalf, Prohibition

Results

References

1893
Rhode Island
Gubernatorial